Charles Louis Bernard de Cléron, comte d'Haussonville (1770–1846) was a French aristocrat and political figure, the father of Joseph d'Haussonville.

A chamberlain at the court of Napoleon I, and a count of the French Empire, under the Bourbon Restoration d'Haussonville became a Peer of France and an opponent of the conservative Jean-Baptiste Villèle ministry.

References

Counts of the First French Empire
French politicians
Peers of France
1770 births
1846 deaths